The Fourth Yoshida Cabinet was the 50th Cabinet of Japan. It was headed by Shigeru Yoshida from October 30, 1952, to May 21, 1953.

Cabinet

References 

Cabinet of Japan
1952 establishments in Japan
Cabinets established in 1952
Cabinets disestablished in 1953
1953 disestablishments in Japan